Vladimir Yevgenyevich Fortov (23 January 1946 – 29 November 2020) was a Russian physicist and politician who served as director of the Joint Institute for High Temperatures (1992–2013) and as president of the Russian Academy of Sciences (2013–2017). His research was in thermal physics, shock waves and plasma physics.

Biography
Fortov studied physics at the Moscow Institute of Physics and Technology, graduating in 1968. In 1971, he received his Candidate of Sciences degree, and in 1976 the Doctor of Sciences degree. He was a professor at the same university from 1982. Between 1971 and 1986 Fortov was employed at the Institute of Chemical Physics in Chernogolovka, and between 1986 and 1992, still being a part-time researcher at the same institution, he was also employed by the Joint Institute for High Temperatures. In 1992, he was appointed the director of this institute.

From 1993 to 1997, Fortov was the chairman of the Russian Foundation for Basic Research, the governmental organization responsible for funding fundamental research. In 1996, he also became a chairman of the State Committee of Science and Technology, and later a minister of science and technology. The government he was a part of retired in 1998.

According to the law, the President of the Russian Academy of Sciences is formally appointed by the President of the Russian Federation. Vladimir Putin, who at the time was the president of Russia, only signed the appointment of Fortov on 8 July 2013. On 20 March 2017, elections for the president of the Academy were scheduled, and Fortov ran as one of the three candidates. Unexpectedly the previous day all candidates retracted their nominations, and the elections were canceled. On 22 March, Fortov resigned, citing health issues, and Valery Kozlov was appointed acting president. Fortov's research was in the areas of thermal physics, shock waves, and plasma physics. He was involved with applications, in particular, to energy production.

Fortov died on 29 November 2020, in Moscow, after being infected with COVID-19.

Recognition
 National awards: Order of the Red Banner of Labour (1986), USSR State Prize (1988), Order "For Merit to the Fatherland" (IV class) (1996), State Prize of the Russian Federation (1997), Medal "In Commemoration of the 850th Anniversary of Moscow" (1998), Order "For Merit to the Fatherland" (III class) (1999), Jubilee Medal "300 Years of the Russian Navy" (2000), Order of Honour (2006), Order of Friendship (2011), Order of Alexander Nevsky (2013), Order "For Merit to the Fatherland" (II class) (2016).
 International awards: Hannes Alfvén Prize (2003), UNESCO Albert Einstein medal (2005), Order of Merit of the Federal Republic of Germany (2006), Legion of Honour (2006), Dr. Phil. Nat. Honoris Causa of Goethe University Frankfurt (2010). Global Energy Prize (2013).

References

1946 births
2020 deaths
Deputy heads of government of the Russian Federation
Moscow Institute of Physics and Technology alumni
Academic staff of the Moscow Institute of Physics and Technology
Russian physicists
Corresponding Members of the USSR Academy of Sciences
Full Members of the Russian Academy of Sciences
Foreign associates of the National Academy of Sciences
Presidents of the Russian Academy of Sciences
State Prize of the Russian Federation laureates
Full Cavaliers of the Order "For Merit to the Fatherland"
Recipients of the Order of Honour (Russia)
Officers Crosses of the Order of Merit of the Federal Republic of Germany
Deaths from the COVID-19 pandemic in Russia